Ronald Cowen (born December 13, 1980 in the USA) is an international-level backstroke swimmer from Bermuda.

At the 2003 Pan American Games, he swam to a Bermuda Record in the 200 free (1:55.48).

International tournaments
1999 Pan Am Games
2001 World Aquatics Championships
2002 Commonwealth Games (50, 100 & 200 freestyles; 100 backstroke)
2003 Island Games
2003 World Aquatics Championships
2003 Pan Am Games
2005 World Aquatics Championships (50, 100 & 200 frees)
2006 Commonwealth Games (50, 100, 200 & 400 frees, 50 fly)

References

1980 births
Living people
Bermudian male swimmers
Bermudian male freestyle swimmers
Male backstroke swimmers
Swimmers at the 1999 Pan American Games
Swimmers at the 2003 Pan American Games
Swimmers at the 2002 Commonwealth Games
Swimmers at the 2006 Commonwealth Games
Pan American Games competitors for Bermuda
Commonwealth Games competitors for Bermuda